Dashdorjiin Tserentogtokh (11 August 1951 – 26 August 2015) was a Mongolian former wrestler who competed in the 1976 Summer Olympics and in the 1980 Summer Olympics.

References

1951 births
2015 deaths
Olympic wrestlers of Mongolia
Wrestlers at the 1976 Summer Olympics
Wrestlers at the 1980 Summer Olympics
Mongolian male sport wrestlers
Asian Games medalists in wrestling
Wrestlers at the 1974 Asian Games
Wrestlers at the 1982 Asian Games
Asian Games gold medalists for Mongolia
Asian Games silver medalists for Mongolia
Medalists at the 1974 Asian Games
Medalists at the 1982 Asian Games
20th-century Mongolian people
21st-century Mongolian people